The decade of the 1480s in art involved some significant events.

Events

 1481 – A group of Florentine painters – Sandro Botticelli, Domenico Ghirlandaio and Cosimo Rosselli – begins work on mural frescos in the Sistine Chapel, Rome, with (perhaps under the direction of) Pietro Perugino.
 1482 – Ludovico Sforza, Duke of Milan, commissions Leonardo da Vinci to make an equestrian statue that would have been the largest in the world. A clay cast is made over sixteen years but the bronze is appropriated for use in cannons and the cast is destroyed when the Duke's castle falls to French invaders.
 1483 – In the Republic of Venice
 A competition to design a monument to Bartolomeo Colleoni is won by Andrea del Verrocchio with an equestrian design.
 Giovanni Bellini is named official painter to the Republic.
 1484 – Albrecht Dürer makes a Self-Portrait at the age of 13 in silverpoint.
 c.1485-1489 – Jean Colombe completes the Très Riches Heures du Duc de Berry for Charles I, Duke of Savoy.
 1487
 Leonardo da Vinci creates his "Vitruvian Man" drawing (approximate date).
 Bernt Notke creates his painted wooden sculpture of Saint George and the Dragon (Sankt Göran och Draken) for the Storkyrkan (Saint Nicholas' church) in Stockholm.
 1488 - Giovanni di Stefano (sculptor) makes floor intarsia showing Hermes Trismegistus, Plato and Marsilio Ficino in the west entrance of Siena Cathedral.

Paintings

 1479-81: Ercole de' Roberti – Santa Maria in Porto Altarpiece
 1480-90: Sandro Botticelli – The Map of Hell
 1480
 Gentile Bellini – Sultan Mehmed II
 Giovanni Bellini – St. Francis in Ecstasy
 Sandro Botticelli – Saint Augustine in His Study (fresco in church of the Ognissanti, Florence) 
 Carlo Crivelli – Madonna and Child
 Domenico Ghirlandaio – St. Jerome in his Study
 Hans Memling
 Advent and Triumph of Christ (Alte Pinakothek, Munich)
 Sibylla Sambetha
 Virgin and Child with Musician Angels and donor with St. George (diptych; Alte Pinakothek, Munich)
 c.1480
 Sandro Botticelli – The Resurrected Christ
 Ercole de' Roberti – Portraits of Giovanni II Bentivoglio and Ginevra Bentivoglio (National Gallery of Art, Washington, D.C.)
 Piero del Pollaiuolo
 Portrait of a Young Woman (Uffizi, Florence)
 Hans Memling
 Christ Surrounded by Musician Angels
 Mater Dolorosa
 Portrait of Barbara van Vlaendenbergh
 Portrait of Willem Morell
 The Virgin and Child with an Angel (National Gallery, London)
 Albertus Pictor – frescoes in Härkeberga Church, Sweden
 1480-1482: Sandro Botticelli – Temptations of Christ (frescoes in Sistine Chapel, Rome)
 1480-1483: Sandro Botticelli – Madonna of the Book
 c.1480-1484: Fra Carnevale (or Francesco di Giorgio Martini) – The Ideal City
 c.1480-1485
 Sandro Botticelli
 Portrait of a young man holding a medallion
 (probable artist) – Portrait of a Young Woman (Städel, Frankfurt)
 Geertgen tot Sint Jans – The Adoration of the Magi
 c.1480-1486: Sandro Botticelli – Portrait of a Young Woman (Simonetta Vespucci?) (Gemäldegalerie, Berlin)
 1481: Hans Memling – Christ Giving His Blessing
 c.1481-1485: Piero di Cosimo – Madonna and Child Enthroned with Saints Peter, John the Baptist, Dominic, and Nicholas of Bari (Saint Louis Art Museum)
 1482: Sandro Botticelli – Primavera
 c.1482: Hans Memling – Annunciation (Metropolitan Museum of Art, New York)
 c.1482-1485: Piero di Cosimo – Portraits of Giuliano and Francesco Giamberti da Sangallo (diptych)
 c.1483
 Sandro Botticelli – Portrait of a Young Man (National Gallery, London)
 Perugino – Portrait of Lorenzo di Credi
 c.1483-1487 (unfinished): Leonardo da Vinci (probable) – Portrait of a Musician 1484: Hans Memling – St. Christopher and Saints c.1485: Hans Memling
 Adam and Eve Bathsheba Triptych of Earthly Vanity and Divine Salvation c.1485-1488: Sandro Botticelli – The Judgement of Paris c.1485-1490: Heinrich Lützelmann (probable painter, perhaps identical with "Master of the Drapery Studies") – The Passion of Christ (series of 10 oils for Sainte-Madeleine, Strasbourg)
 1486: Carlo Crivelli – The Annunciation, with Saint Emidius c.1486: Sandro Botticelli – The Birth of Venus 1487: Hans Memling – Diptych of Maarten van Nieuwenhove (Old St. John's Hospital, Bruges)
 c.1487-1488: Michelangelo – The Torment of Saint Anthony 1489: 
 Hans Memling – St. Ursula Shrine (reliquary for Old St. John's Hospital, Bruges)
 Cima da Conegliano – Madonna and Child Enthroned with Saint James and Saint Jerome and Madonna and Child Enthroned with Two Male SaintsBirths
 1480: Domenico Alfani – Italian painter (died 1553)
 1480: Giovanni Francesco Caroto – Italian painter active in Verona (died 1555/1558)
 1480: Lorenzo Lotto – Italian painter, draughtsman and illustrator (died 1556)
 1480: Hans Leonhard Schäufelein – German painter, designer and wood engraver (died 1540)
 1480: Andrea di Aloigi - Italian painter (died 1521) 
 1480: Palma il Vecchio – Italian painter of the Venetian school (died 1528)
 1480: Bartolomé Ordóñez - Spanish sculptor (died 1520)
 1480: Hans Brüggemann - German sculptor (died 1521)
 1480: Marcantonio Raimondi – Italian engraver (died 1534)
 1480: Hans Baldung – German Renaissance artist as painter and printmaker in woodcut (died 1545)
 1480: Jean Clouet – miniaturist and painter working in France during the Renaissance (died 1541)
 1480: Nicola Filotesio – Italian painter, architect and sculptor (died 1547)
 1480: Damià Forment - Spanish sculptor (died 1540)
 1480: Joachim Patinir – Flemish Northern Renaissance history and landscape painter (died 1524)
 1480: Nicola da Urbino - Italian maiolica and ceramicist (died 1540/1547)
 1480: Albrecht Altdorfer – German painter, pioneer of landscape in art (died 1538)
 1480: Erhard Altdorfer - German Early Renaissance printmaker, painter, and architect (died 1561)
 1480: Jerg Ratgeb – German painter (died 1526)
 1480: Jan Rombouts the Elder - Flemish Renaissance painter, glass painter, draftsman, printmaker and glass designer (died 1535)
 1480: Gerino da Pistoia - Italian painter and designer of the Renaissance (died 1529)
 1480: Raimo Epifanio Tesauro – Italian Renaissance painter specializing in frescoes (died 1511)
 1480: Jan Wellens de Cock - Flemish painter and draughtsman of the Northern Renaissance (died 1527)
 1480: Hans Maler zu Schwaz - German painter and portraitist (died 1526/1529)
 c.1480: Benedetto Montagna – Italian engraver and painter (died 1555/1558)
 1480/1482: Bernardino Luini – North Italian painter from Leonardo's circle (died 1532)
 1480/1485: Girolamo da Santa Croce - Italian Renaissance painter (died 1556)
 1480/1485: Girolamo Savoldo – Italian High Renaissance painter (died 1548)
 1480/1490: Adriaen Isenbrandt – Flemish Northern Renaissance painter (died 1551)
 1480/1490: Joos van Cleve –  Netherlandish painter (died 1540/1541)
 1480/1490: Ortolano Ferrarese – Italian painter of the Ferrara School (died 1525)
 1480/1490: Conrad Meit – German-born sculptor (died 1550/51)
 1481: Hans Krafft the Elder, German medallist (died 1542)
 1481: Baldassare Peruzzi – Italian architect and painter (died 1536)
 1481: Benedetto Montagna – Italian engraver (died 1555/1558)
 1481: Benvenuto Tisi (il Garofalo) – Late-Renaissance-Mannerist Italian painter of the School of Ferrara (died 1559)
 1482: Richard Aertsz – Dutch historical painter (died 1577)
 1482: Giulio Campagnola – Italian engraver and painter, invented the stipple technique in engraving (died 1515)
 1482: Franciabigio – Italian painter of the Florentine Renaissance (died 1525)
 1483: Raphael – Italian painter and architect of the High Renaissance (died 1520)
 1483: Chén Chún – Chinese artist specializing in "ink and wash" paintings (died 1544)
 1483: Agostino Busti – High Renaissance Italian sculptor (died 1548)
 1483: Il Pordenone – Italian painter of the Venetian school, active during the Renaissance (died 1539)
 1483: Simon Bening – miniature painter of the Ghent-Bruges school (died 1561)
 1484: Niklaus Manuel – Swiss dramaturg, painter, graphic artist and politician (died 1530)
 1484: Giacomo Raibolini, Italian painter (died 1557)
 1485: Titian – leader of the 16th-century Venetian school of the Italian Renaissance (died 1576)
 1485: Urs Graf – Swiss Renaissance painter and printmaker of woodcuts, etchings and engravings (d. c.1529)
 1485: Sebastiano del Piombo (byname of Sebastiano Luciani) – Italian Renaissance-Mannerist  painter, famous for his combination of the colors of the Venetian school and the monumental forms of the Roman school (died 1547)
 1485: Jost de Negker, Dutch woodcut-maker, printer and publisher (died 1544)
 1485: Francesco Vecellio – Venetian painter of the early Renaissance, best known as the elder brother of the painter Titian (died 1560)
 1485: Jean Duvet – French Renaissance goldsmith and engraver (died 1562)
 1485: Wolf Huber – Austrian painter, printmaker, and architect, a leading member of the Danube School (died 1553)
 1485: Girolamo Romanino, Italian painter (died 1566)
 1485: Jean Juste – Italian sculptor (died 1549)
 1485: Agostino Marti - Italian painter from Lucca (died 1537)
 1485: Étienne Peson - French "primitive" painter (died 1551)
 1485: Antonio Semini – Italian painter active in his native Genoa (died 1547)
 1485: Lambert Barnard - English Renaissance painter (died 1567)
 1486: Paolo Moranda Cavazzola – Italian painter active mainly in his hometown of Verona (died 1522)
 1486: Domenico di Pace Beccafumi – Italian Renaissance-Mannerist painter (died 1551)
 1486: Jacopo Sansovino – Italian sculptor and architect, especially around the Piazza San Marco in Venice (died 1570)
 1486: Andrea del Sarto – Italian painter from Florence (died 1531)
 1486: Giacomo Francia – Italian engraver (died 1557)
 1486: Francesco Torbido - Italian painter (died 1562)
 1487: Francesco Xanto Avelli – Italian ceramicist (died 1542)
 1487: Giulio Raibolini, Italian painter (died 1540)
 1487: Andrea Sabbatini – Italian painter of the Renaissance (died 1530)
 1487-1491: Bernard van Orley – Flemish Northern Renaissance painter and draughtsman (died 1541)
 1487: Bonifazio Veronese -  Italian Mannerist painter from Venice (died 1553)
 1488: Alonso Berruguete – Spanish painter, sculptor and architect (died 1561)
 1488: Xie Shichen – Chinese landscape painter during the Ming dynasty (d. unknown)
 1488: Girolamo della Robbia, Italian ceramicist (died 1566)
 1489: Antonio da Correggio – painter of the Parma school of the Italian Renaissance (died 1534)

Deaths
 1489: Simon Marmion – Netherlandish painter (born 1425)
 1489: Marco del Buono - Italian painter and woodworker (born 1402)
 1488: Andrea del Verrocchio, influential Italian sculptor, goldsmith and painter who worked at the court of Lorenzo de' Medici in Florence (born 1435)
 1487: Baccio Baldini - Italian engraver in Florence (born 1436)
 1486: Cristoforo de Predis - Italian miniaturist and illuminator (born 1440)
 1486: Nicolas Froment – French painter (born 1435)
 1485: Shingei –  Japanese painter and artist in the Muromachi period (born 1431)
 1484: Mino da Fiesole – Italian sculptor from Tuscany (born 1429)
 1484: Silvestro de Buoni - Italian Quattrocento painter (born unknown'')
 1484: Fra Carnevale -  Italian painter of the Quattrocento (born 1420/1425)
 1484: Di Biagio Baldassarre del Firenze - Italian Renaissance painter of the Florentine School (born 1430)
 1483: Stefano d'Antonio di Vanni - Italian Renaissance painter (born 1405)
 1482: Hugo van der Goes, Flemish painter (born 1440)
 1482: Giovanni di Paolo – Italian painter and illustrator of manuscripts (born 1399/1403)
 1482: Luca della Robbia – Italian sculptor from Florence, noted for his terracotta roundels (born 1400)
 1482: Agnolo degli Erri -  Italian Gothic painter of the Italian Renaissance (born 1440)
 1482: Bartolomeo degli Erri -  Italian Gothic painter of the Italian Renaissance (born 1447)
 1481: Jean Fouquet – French painter, a master of both panel painting and manuscript illumination, and the apparent inventor of the portrait miniature (died 1420)
 1481: Agostino di Duccio – Italian early Renaissance sculptor (born 1418)
 1481: Sano di Pietro – early Italian Renaissance painter from Siena (born 1406)
 1480: Vecchietta – Siennese painter (born 1410)
 1480: Simone Papa the Elder – Italian painter of the Renaissance period (born 1430)
 1480: Joos van Wassenhove – Early Netherlandish painter who later worked in Italy (born 1410)
 1480: Lin Liang – Chinese painter of plum, flower, and fruit works during the Ming dynasty (born 1416)
 1480: Antonio Vivarini - Italian painter of the Vivarini family of painters (born 1440)

 
Art
Years of the 15th century in art